The Egyptian Social Democratic Party is a social liberal and a social democratic party in Egypt. It was founded after the 2011 Egyptian Revolution by the merger of two minor liberal parties, the Liberal Egyptian Party, and the Egyptian Democratic Party on 29 March 2011.

Notable founding members include Mohamed Abou El-Ghar, film maker Daoud Abdel Sayed, activist Amr Hamzawy, Mervat Tallawy, former UN under-secretary and executive secretary of ESCWA and Hazem Al Beblawi, former executive secretary of the ESCWA. However, Amr Hamzawy resigned from the party in April to form the Freedom Egypt Party on 18 May 2011.

In August 2012, the party was admitted into the Socialist International as a consultative member.

The Egyptian Social Democratic Party and the Tagammu Party ran in the 2012 Shura council election as part of the Egyptian Bloc. The division of seats between the two parties in the Shura Council is unclear.

The party was accepted into the Party of European Socialists (PES) on 18 February 2013.

Following the removal of Mohamed Morsi from office in July 2013, a founding member of the Social Democratic Party named Ziad Bahaa El-Din was reportedly offered the post of Prime Minister. Younes Makhioun, chairman of the Nour Party, objected to Bahaa El-Din's appointment and to the involvement of Mohamed ElBaradei, because both of them belong to the same political coalition (the National Salvation Front). However, later another founding member of the Social Democratic Party named Hazem Al Beblawi was appointed as interim prime minister on 9 July. He subsequently suspended his membership in the Social Democratic Party. His cabinet was sworn in on 16 July 2013.

References

External links
  

Political parties established in 2011
Liberal parties in Egypt
Secularism in Egypt
Social democratic parties in Africa
Social democratic parties in Asia
Social liberal parties
Liberal parties in Asia
2011 establishments in Egypt
Progressive Alliance
Full member parties of the Socialist International
Socialist parties in Egypt